Ben Bag-Bag (literally, son of Bag-Bag) was a rabbinic sage and disciple of Hillel the Elder during the late Zugot or early Tannaitic period. Aside from a single maxim quoted at the end of Mishna Avot (Pirkei Avot chapter 5) he is not mentioned. There he says, Turn it, and turn it, for everything is in it. Reflect on it and grow old and gray with it. Don't turn from it, for nothing is better than it. This maxim is followed by that of another sage, ben Hai-Hai. Some considered ben Bag-Bag and ben Hai-Hai to be the same person.

A tradition recorded by Tosafos in Chagigah 9b has it that both ben Bag-Bag and ben Hai-Hai were converts to Judaism (gerim). Some speculate that their unusual names hid the true identities of gerim persecuted by Roman authorities during the Roman occupation of the Land of Israel. Another Rabbinic tradition holds that ben Bag-Bag was the person (sometimes described as a Roman soldier) who in a tale of Shammai and Hillel requests the sages to teach him the whole Torah while standing on one foot.

Some would also identify ben Bag-Bag with Yoḥanan ben Bag-Bag, a tanna mentioned on Kiddushin 10b. A tanna by the name of ben Bag Bag appears several other times in the Talmud, and scholars identify him as the same Yochanan ben Bag Bag.

References

Mishnah rabbis
Pirkei Avot rabbis
Converts to Judaism